Rhytachne is a genus of plants in the grass family. They grow principally in wet savannahs in Africa and the Americas. More specifically, they tend to prefer transitional zones between marshes and drier upland savannahs. In the Americas the genus can be found from southern Mexico and Cuba south to northern Argentina, while in Africa it is present in Sub-Saharan Africa, including in Madagascar. Twelve species are included, of which nine are African, two are American, and one, Rhytachne subgibbosa, is found on both continents. The genus is closely related to Coelorachis.

 Species
 Rhytachne furtiva Clayton  - Ghana, Burkina Faso
 Rhytachne glabra (Gledhill) Clayton - Guinea, Sierra Leone, Ivory Coast
 Rhytachne gonzalezii Davidse - Suriname, Venezuela (Guárico, Apure), Brazil (Pará)
 Rhytachne gracilis Stapf - West Africa from Senegal to Cameroon
 Rhytachne guianensis (Hitchc.) Clayton  - Mexico (Tabasco), Venezuela (Guárico, Apure, Amazonas, Bolívar), Guyana, Suriname, Brazil (Amapá, Minas Gerais)
 Rhytachne latifolia Clayton - Tanzania, Zambia
 Rhytachne megastachya Jacq.-Fél. Ghana, Guinea, Liberia, Sierra Leone
 Rhytachne perfecta Jacq.-Fél.  - Guinea
 Rhytachne robusta Stapf - Zambia, Angola,  Namibia
 Rhytachne rottboellioides Desv. ex Ham. - Madagascar, tropical + southern Africa
 Rhytachne subgibbosa (Winkler ex Hack.) Clayton - Yucatán Peninsula in Mexico; Honduras, Brazil, Argentina, Paraguay, Zambia
 Rhytachne triaristata (Steud.) Stapf - tropical Africa

 formerly included
see Loxodera Phacelurus Thelepogon Urelytrum

References

Andropogoneae
Poaceae genera
Grasses of Africa
Grasses of North America
Grasses of South America
Grasses of Brazil
Grasses of Mexico